Verkhniye Kigi (Ürge Qıyğı) is a rural locality (a selo) and the administrative center of Kiginsky District in the Republic of Bashkortostan, Russia. Population:

References

Notes

Sources

Rural localities in Kiginsky District
Ufa Governorate